The Kenyan Cross Country Championships is an annual cross country running competition that serves as the national championship for Kenya. It is organised by Athletics Kenya and has permit race status from the International Association of Athletics Federations. It is typically held in February in Nairobi, the country's capital, and entrants are almost exclusively from Kenya. Entrants represent their home region or one of the high level national works teams, such as Kenya Defence Forces, Kenya Police, Prisons or Universities. These teams host their own annual team championships in order to decide their selections for the national event.

Also known as the KCB Nairobi Cross, the event doubles as the national trials for international competitions, such as the IAAF World Cross Country Championships and African Cross Country Championships. Matching international programmes, four races feature at the championships: senior men's and women's races (10 km), a junior men's race (8 km) and a junior women's race (6 km). Senior men's and women's races distances had been 12 km and 8 km respectively until 2015. Athletes most often receive selection for their performances in these races, although the national governing body may opt to send athletes on their form outside of this race. A short race for senior men and women was also present on the championships' one-day programme between 1998 and 2006, as short races were contested at the annual world championships during this period.

The event attracts a very high standard of athletes, reflecting Kenya's strength long-distance running. The growth of the championships in the 1980s coincided with the country's increasing prowess in the cross country discipline, which has seen it win all but four of the men's team world titles since 1986 and numerous women's team titles since 1990. Paul Tergat is the most successful athlete of the championships, having won the men's race on four occasions. Jane Ngotho is the most successful woman, courtesy of her three straight victories from 1988 to 1990. Rose Cheruiyot was the only athlete to win both long and short national titles in her career, taking the long race in 1995 before become short course champion in 2001.

Past winners

Senior race

The fastest Kenyan in 2007 was Hellen Musyoka who was runner-up in 27:07.0 minutes.

Short race

Statistics
Most successful athletes
Paul Tergat: 1992, 1995, 1996, 2000
Paul Kipkoech: 1984, 1985, 1987, 1988
Jane Ngotho: 1988, 1989, 1990
Paul Koech: 1997, 1998, 1999
Bedan Karoki Muchiri: 2012, 2014, 2015

References

List of winners
Kenyan Championships. GBR Athletics. Retrieved on 2016-04-06.
Civai, Franco & Evans, Kip Evans (2017-02-26). National Crosscountry Champions for Kenya. Association of Road Racing Statisticians. Retrieved 2019-07-18.

External links
Athletics Kenya official website

Athletics competitions in Kenya
National cross country running competitions
Sport in Nairobi
February sporting events
Cross country running in Kenya
Annual sporting events in Kenya